Patricia S. Cowings (born December 15, 1948) is an aerospace psychophysiologist. She was the first American woman to be trained as a scientist astronaut by NASA; though she was an alternate for a space flight in 1979, she did not travel to space. She is most known for her studies in the physiology of astronauts in outer space, as well as helping find cures for astronaut's motion sickness.

Early life and family
Cowings was born and raised in The Bronx, New York City on December 15, 1948. She is the only daughter of Sadie B. and Albert S. Cowings. Sadie was an assistant preschool teacher and Albert was a grocery store owner. She had three other brothers who went on to become a two-star army general, a jazz musician, and a freelance journalist. Her parents emphasized education as a "way of getting out of the Bronx."

Education

Patricia found her love for science at a young age. Patricia was involved in African dance and step and graduated with a bachelor's degree in the arts from the State University of New York at Stony Brook in 1970. Psychology and later psychophysiology showed her how to enhance human potential.  'What better field is there than to study the animal who created all the other fields?  Humans!'  This love was further helped by her psychologist aunt, whom she considered a deep inspiration because she had earned a PhD from the University of California at Davis in 1973. Taking an engineering class in grad school where she took part in designing a space shuttle helped launch her desire to work in the field of space technology.

Career

She did most of her research at NASA Ames Research Center. There she developed and patented a physiological training system called Autogenic-Feedback Training Exercise (AFTE), which enables people to learn voluntary self-control of up to 24 bodily responses in six hours. Her work was first tested in 1985 for (STS 51-b & STS 51c) Spacelab-3 and the first DOD shuttle mission.  She tested her AFTE training method also on the Space J-Lab Mission (the first Japanese shuttle mission), with her work focusing on ridding of the astronaut's motion sickness. Later she trained four cosmonauts to control both motion sickness and low blood pressure after six months in space aboard the MIR space station. She found success with her biofeedback methods and continued to teach people how to control motion sickness, improve the performance of search and rescue pilots, and reduce symptoms of several patient populations suffering from nausea, dizziness and fainting. She has helped author several publications with her husband, Dr. William B. Toscano. They have a son, Christopher Michael Cowings Toscano, who traveled with them as they trained space crews.

Today, she continues her work helping to prevent motion sickness for astronauts in space, as well as helping control motion sickness for their return home. She is the principal investigator of Psychophysiological Research Laboratories at NASA Ames Research Center and has held adjunct professorships in Psychiatry at UCLA and both medical and clinical psychology at the uniformed services university.  (ARC).

Awards and honors
Her research and teaching has garnered her several awards, including:

Candace Award, National Coalition of 100 Black Women (1989)
NASA Individual Achievement Award (1993)
Black Engineer of the Year Award (1997) 
AMES Honor Award for Technology Development (1999)
NASA Space Act Award for Invention (2002)
National Women of Color Technology Award (2006) 
NASA Space Act Board Award (2008) 
Ames African American Advisory Group's (AAAG) Achievement Award (2010) 
Celestial Torch Award from the National Society of Black Engineers (NSBE) in Los Angeles (2014)

References

1948 births
Living people
African-American scientists
American physiologists
Women physiologists
American women scientists
University of California, Davis alumni
Stony Brook University alumni
David Geffen School of Medicine at UCLA faculty
NASA people
American women academics
21st-century African-American people
21st-century African-American women
20th-century African-American people
20th-century African-American women